Sirichai Thaiyen or Yodmongkol Vor Saengthep or Yodmongkol CP Freshmart (nicknamed: Gig, กิ๊ก; born: December 24, 1990 in Muak Lek District,  Saraburi Province) is a professional boxer from Thailand. He is the former interim WBA Flyweight  champion, currently he is PABA Flyweight champion.

Career history
Vor Saengthep began fighting professionally in 2009. He successfully challenged for WBA interim title in Flyweight weight class against Koki Eto from Japan by TKO in round 12 on November 29, 2013, at City Hall Ground, Chonburi, Thailand. On December 20, 2014, he lost to Juan Carlos Reveco  by TKO in the round 5 for WBA world champion title in Flyweight weight class at Polideportivo Gustavo Toro Rodríguez, San Martín, Mendoza, Argentina to decide a true champion.

On June 17, 2018, he faced Artem Dalakian undefeated Ukrainian WBA Flyweight world title holder in Kyiv, as no. 1 challenger. In this time, he has two former WBC world champions, Sirimongkol Singwangcha and Oleydong Sithsamerchai as a boxing partners. The result is that he was knockdown 3 times before defeated TKO in round 8.

Titles in boxing
WBC World Youth Light Flyweight champion

WBA World Interim Flyweight champion

PABA Flyweight champion

References

External links

1990 births
Living people
Flyweight boxers
World Boxing Association champions
Yodmongkol Vor Saengthep
Yodmongkol Vor Saengthep